Colin Melville Genge (October 2, 1859 – March 25, 1910) was a politician, contractor and business man from Alberta, Canada.

Early life
Genge was born in Kingston, Ontario in the year 1859. He moved to Fort Macleod, North-West Territories in 1881 and married his wife Anne May Ryan in 1884. Upon moving to Fort Macleod Genge became involved in numerous local business ventures. He operated a hardware store, owned a sandstone quarry, and ran the Fort Macleod Telephone Company.

Along with his retail and telecom ventures Genge also worked as a contractor. He designed and built the Queens Hotel in 1903 using sandstone from his own quarry.

Genge became interested in politics and started his career on the municipal level serving 2 terms as Mayor of Fort Macleod beginning in 1904.

Political career and death
The province of Alberta was created out of the North-West Territories in 1905. Genge was elected to the Legislative Assembly of Alberta in the 1909 Alberta general election. He defeated Conservative Party candidate E.P. McNeill in a hotly contested election. Genge died less than a full year in his first term in office in 1910 vacating his seat in the legislature.

References

External links
Alberta Legislature Members Listing

"Colin Melville Genge: Mayor of Fort Macleod, 1900 and elected Member of Provincial Parliament, 1910" written by Marilyn Shaw-Guisset(2000) 

Alberta Liberal Party MLAs
1859 births
1910 deaths